This is a list of chairpersons of the Social Democratic Party of Austria.

Social Democratic Workers' Party (SDAPÖ)

Social Democratic Party (SPÖ) 

Social Democratic Party of Austria